Federico Franchini (born 23 January 1994) is an Italian football player. He plays for Villafranca.

Club career
He made his Serie C debut for Lumezzane on 1 September 2013 in a game against Pro Vercelli.

References

External links
 

1994 births
Sportspeople from the Province of Verona
Living people
Italian footballers
Italian expatriate footballers
Association football midfielders
Italy youth international footballers
A.C. ChievoVerona players
F.C. Lumezzane V.G.Z. A.S.D. players
A.C. Carpi players
S.S. Maceratese 1922 players
Fermana F.C. players
S.S. Juve Stabia players
Mosta F.C. players
Serie C players
Serie D players
Maltese Premier League players
Italian expatriate sportspeople in Malta
Expatriate footballers in Malta
Footballers from Veneto